Söhne Mannheims (German: [ˈzøːnə ˈmanhaɪms]; Sons of Mannheim) is a German pop and soul band founded 1995 in Mannheim by Xavier Naidoo and others.

History 
The Group was founded in 1995 by Xavier Naidoo, Claus Eisenmann, Robbee Mariano and others.

In 2000 they released their first studio album Zion. The biggest hit from this album was "Geh Davon Aus" (it translates as "Assume That"). After several solo projects by the group members, they met in the studio to record their second album, Noiz. Their second big hit was the song "Und Wenn ein Lied" ("And When a Song"), which stood at number 2 on the German single-chart for the whole winter of 2005. After a lot of concerns, they released the live-album Power of the Sound.

With the Single Wenn du schläfst, which appeared early in 2005, they helped the project World Vision Deutschland and encouraged their fans to join with the slogan: "Erhebt eure Stimme gegen Armut!" ("Raise your voice against poverty!").

Claus Eisenmann left the band in 2006 because he appeared in a TV commercial and violated the band's philosophy.  Eisenmann given reason was that Naidoo has led the band as a "dictator".

From the 12 January 2007 until the 10 February 2007 they made a Club-Tour through Europe.  They began in Belgium with a stop in Bielefeld. On the concerts from this tour they sang songs from the album Iz On, which was released in 2009. The Concerts were fully sold out in Germany, Austria and Switzerland.  Since the 10 March 2007 they gave one more time 6 concerts under the title Zwischenräume – Zweiklang im Einklang together with the Southwest German Radio Symphony Orchestra.

On 31 August 2007 they released the compilation Söhne, Mond und Sterne, which contains songs of the band members. With this selection they wanted to show the diversity of their style directions. But the album could only reach the Austrian charts.

One year later, also in August they released their first number-one-hit Das hat die Welt noch nicht gesehen.

The studio album Iz On appeared on 10 July 2009. It was planned for 2008, but they shifted it to 2009 to release a recording for MTV Unplugged, which was released in September as Dubble-CD and in October as Dubble-DVD.

The fourth studio album was released on 13 May 2011 Barrikaden von Eden. iTunes classified it in the Pop genre but it also has techno-songs and ballads.

On 15 July 2011 appeared Freiheit. The song was dedicated to the Amnesty International. Amnesty International made a video with them, because they had existed fifty years.

In February 2013, they participated on the predetermining for the Eurovision Song Contest for Germans, but lost to Cascada.

On 20 April 2018, it was announced that their founding member and bassist Robbee Mariano had died.

Discography

Albums

Studio albums

Concert albums

Compilations

Singles

DVDs

Awards 
 ECHO - "Best National Group" (2005)

References

External links 
 

Musical groups established in 1995
German musical groups